Krishna Singh may refer to:
Krishna Singh Rawat, 19th-century Indian cartographer
Krishna Singh (politician) (1867–1961), Indian politician from Bihar
Krishna Pal Singh (1922–1999), Indian politician from Madhya Pradesh
Hari Krishna Singh, Indian politician from Madhya Pradesh
S. K. Singh (general), former Vice Chief of the Indian Army
Krishna Singh (golfer), Fijian golfer